Vasudeva II (Middle Brahmi script:  Vā-su-de-va) was a Kushan emperor who ruled . He was probably the successor of Kanishka III and may have been succeeded by a king named Shaka Kushan.

Vasudeva II probably only was a local ruler in the area of Taxila, in western Punjab, under the suzerainty of the Gupta Empire.

Vasudeva II was a contemporary of Hormizd I Kushanshah of the Kushano-Sasanians, as he is known to have overstruck a large quantity of the early copper coins of Hormizd I issued south of the Hindu-Kush.

References

Sources

External links
 See: Vasudeva II coin
 Coins of late Kushan emperors
 Online catalogue of coins of Vasudeva II

Kushan emperors
3rd-century Indian monarchs